Zé Eduardo is a short form of Portuguese given name José Eduardo, and may refer to:
Zé Eduardo (footballer, born 1987), real name José Eduardo Bischofe de Almeida, Brazilian footballer
Zé Eduardo (footballer, born 1991), real name José Eduardo de Araújo, Brazilian footballer
Zé Eduardo (footballer, born 1999), real name José Eduardo de Andrade, Brazilian footballer